Thomas Somers (born 28 April 1997) is a British sprinter who specialises in the 200 metres. He tied DaBryan Blanton for the second fastest 200 metres ran by a youth athlete, only behind Usain Bolt, and was ranked as the 6th fastest senior European athlete over the distance in 2014 while still competing as a youth. A former England U16 rugby international, Somers initially took up athletics to complement his rugby training but after taking advice from Adam Gemili quit rugby to do athletics full-time in late 2013.

In 2013, Somers represented Britain at the World Youth Championships running a new PB in every round and finishing the final in 4th position with a time of 20.84 seconds. In 2014 while still eligible to compete at youth level Somers represented Britain at the 2014 World Junior Championships where he ran a new personal best and European Youth Best of 20.37 seconds in the semi final before tiring in the final itself and finishing in 7th place.

In February 2015, Somers tore his hamstring in the semi final of the 60m at the British Indoor Championships and after undergoing surgery he was ruled out from competition for the rest of the 2015 season.

References

External links

1997 births
British male sprinters
Living people